Bathyraja maccaini, also known as McCain's skate, is a species of softnose skate in the family Arhynchobatidae. It is found in Antarctic and Subantarctic waters at depths of between 167 and 500 metres.

It is currently listed by the IUCN as being least concern.

McCain's skate is slow-growing, reaching its full size of 120 centimetres after 10 years or more.

Named in honor of Antarctic zoologist John C. McCain, collector of the type, aboard the M/V Hero in 1967.

References 

Bathyraja
Fish of Antarctica
Taxa named by Stewart Springer
Fish described in 1941